Parliamentary elections were held in Austria on 9 October 1949. About 500,000 registered Nazis, who were not allowed to vote in 1945, regained their voting rights. A newly created party, the Electoral Party of Independents (WdU) (a predecessor of the Freedom Party of Austria) specifically targeted this group of voters and immediately won a large share of votes. The Austrian People's Party remained strongest party, although losing their absolute majority of seats. Leopold Figl stayed as Chancellor, leading a coalition with the Socialist Party of Austria as junior partner.

Results

References

Elections in Austria
Austria
Parliament
Austrian Parliament